Xiacheng District was one of the former urban districts of the prefecture-level city of Hangzhou, the capital of Zhejiang Province, East China, it is located in the core urban area of Hangzou.

Its postal code is 310006.

The district government is located on 200 Qingchun Rd.

On April 9, 2021, the Xiacheng District was merged to Gongshu District.

Administrative divisions
Subdistricts:
Wulin Subdistrict (武林街道), Tianshui Subdistrict (天水街道), Chaohui Subdistrict (朝晖街道), Chaoming Subdistrict (潮鸣街道), Changqing Subdistrict (长庆街道), Shiqiao Subdistrict (石桥街道), Dongxin Subdistrict (东新街道), Wenhui Subdistrict (文晖街道)

References

External links
Official website of Xiacheng District government

Geography of Hangzhou
Districts of Zhejiang
Former districts of China